Mirza Ali-ye Yelqi (also Romanized as Mīrzā ‘Alī-ye Yelqī and Mīrzā ‘Alī-ye Yolqī; also known as Mīrzā ‘Alī-ye Yolfī) is a village in Gorganbuy Rural District, in the Central District of Aqqala County, Golestan Province, Iran. At the 2006 census, its population was 1,064, in 212 families.

References 

Populated places in Aqqala County